Higashihara (written: 東原 lit. "east plain") is a Japanese surname. Notable people with the surname include:

, Japanese television personality, model and gravure idol
, Japanese jazz drummer

Japanese-language surnames